Borovets is a village in Kocherinovo Municipality, Kyustendil Province, south-western Bulgaria. As of 2013 it has 94 inhabitants. It is situated close to the right bank of the Struma River at 2 km to the north-west of the municipal centre Kocherinovo.

Citations

Villages in Kyustendil Province